The Baader-Meinhof Group, also known as Red Army Faction, was a left-wing militant group active in West Germany from 1970 to 1998.

Baader-Meinhof may also refer to:

 Der Baader Meinhof Komplex, a 2008 film by Uli Edel
 Baader Meinhof (album), a 1996 album by Luke Haines
 "Baader-Meinhof", a 1978 song by the band Cabaret Voltaire
 "Baader-Meinhof Blues", a song by Brazilian rock group Legião Urbana on their eponymous 1985 album Legião Urbana
 Frequency illusion, a cognitive bias colloquially known as the Baader–Meinhof effect 
 A pseudonym for the rapper Ghostemane